Theuns Andries Willem 'Worsie' Kotzé (born 16 July 1987 in Karasburg, South-West Africa) is a Namibian international rugby union player, currently playing with the  in South African domestic rugby.

Career

2005 : Schools rugby

Kotzé was born in South-West Africa – before the country gained independence from South Africa and was renamed Namibia – but grew up in Upington in South Africa's Northern Cape province. From there, he was selected to represent  at the premier South African high schools competition, the Under-18 Craven Week, in 2005.

2006–2010 : Leopards / NWU Pukke

After school, Kotzé moved to Potchefstroom where he enrolled at North West University, also joining the  rugby academy.

In 2008, he represented university side  in the inaugural Varsity Cup tournament. That was his only appearance in the competition, but he once again represented the Leopards U21 side in the Provincial Championship in the latter half of the season.

He returned to Varsity Cup action in 2009, mainly playing as a scrum-half for NWU Pukke. His team won five of their seven matches to finish in third position on the log to qualify for the semi-finals. He was an unused replacement in their 19–17 semi-final victory over UCT in Cape Town, but played off the bench in the final, as they lost 6–11 to the other Western Cape-based university, .

Kotzé established himself as the first-choice full-back and goal-kicker for NWU Pukke during the 2010 Varsity Cup. He started all eight of their matches in the competition, scoring two tries and kicking 67 points to finish the competition as the leading points scorer. Despite this, his side only reached the semi-finals of the competition, where they were eliminated by eventual champions .

It was a disappointing season for the Leopards, however, as they lost all fourteen of their matches in the competition to finish bottom of the log.

2011 : UJ / Welwitschias

At the start of 2011, Kotzé once again played in the Varsity Cup, but this time in the colours of Johannesburg-based university side . Despite improving on the 77 points he scored in 2010 to be the tournament top scorer, getting 82 points for UJ in 2011, he finished third in the points-scoring charts behind Demetri Catrakilis and Wesley Dunlop.

At the conclusion of the 2011 Varsity Cup, he joined up with Namibian side ' Vodacom Cup squad.

2011 : Rugby World Cup

They faced African rivals  in their third match, which the defending champions won 87–0, and suffered another big defeat in their final match against , going down 7–81, with Kotzé converting a Heinz Koll try. With four defeats out of four, Namibia finished bottom of Pool D to be eliminated from the competition.

2012 : UJ

He returned to domestic action at the start of 2012, to play in his fifth Varsity Cup season. He started in six of 's seven matches during the regular season, which included a 93–0 win over  during which Kotzé converted eleven of the twelve tries scored in the match for a personal points haul of 33 points in the match. UJ finished in third position on the log and qualified for a semi-final match against , but suffered a 0–23 loss to be eliminated from the competition.

2012 : SWD Eagles

He appeared for them in seven consecutive matches in the competition; five starts and twice as a replacement. The SWD Eagles eventually finished in fifth position on the log, missing out on the play-offs.

Kotzé then returned to Namibia, where he played in two more international matches – against  and  respectively.

2013 : Durbanville-Bellville

Kotzé then joined Cape Town-based club side Durbanville-Bellville, one of two teams that represented Western Province Rugby Union in the inaugural SARU Community Cup competition. Kotzé appeared in three of their matches in the competition, scoring a total of 29 points in their matches against Pretoria Police, African Bombers and Bloemfontein Police to help Durbanville-Bellville qualify for the quarter finals, where they eventually won the Bowl competition, effectively finishing in 5th position.

2013–2014 : Aix / 2015 Rugby World Cup qualification

Kotzé then moved to France, where he joined an  team that was recently relegated from the Pro D2 to the Fédérale 1. He appeared in sixteen of their eighteen matches during the regular season to help them finish in third position in Pool 2 in the competition to qualify for the play-off phase of the competition. He started both legs of their Last 16 tie against FC Oloron and came on as a replacement in their Quarter Final second leg match against Massy, which they lost 14–34 to remain in the league for 2014–15. Kotzé scored 187 points for Aix during the season, scoring two tries, 47 penalties and 18 conversions.

He also played for Namibia at the 2014 Africa Cup, where they were promoted to Division 1A, the top tier of the competition, which also doubled up as the final qualification phase of the African qualification series for the 2015 Rugby World Cup. Kotzé played in all three their matches against Kenya, Zimbabwe and hosts . Kotzé converted twelve of Namibia's thirteen tries that they scored in their final match, an 89–10 victory over Madagascar, to seal a place for Namibia in the Rugby World Cup in dramatic fashion as they won the title on points difference from Kenya and Zimbabwe after all three sides finished level on log points.

2014–2015 : Bourg-en-Bresse

For the 2014–15 season, he joined another team that was recently relegated from the Pro D2 to the Fédérale 1, . He started thirteen matches for them, scoring 141 points through two tries, 37 penalties and ten conversions to help them finish in fourth position on the Pool 2 log to qualify for the play-offs. However, for the second year in a row, Kotzé tasted defeat in the play-offs, with Bourg-en-Bresse losing to Vannes in the Last 16 on this occasion.

Kotzé was once again involved with the Namibian national team during his time at Bourg-en-Bresse.

2015 : Rugby World Cup

As part of Namibia's preparation for the 2015 Rugby World Cup, Kotzé played in several matches in the run-up to the tournament; he played in all three of their matches in the 2015 Africa Cup – helping them win all three to retain the title they won in 2014 – as well as matches against  in Romania and two matches against  in Windhoek.

He also featured in all three of Namibia's matches in Pool C of the Rugby World Cup. He kicked three penalties in their 14–58 defeat to defending champions  in their opening match and converted all three of the tries that his side scored against  in their 21–35 defeat in their second match. He scored all of Namibia's 16 points (one converted try and three penalties) in their match against  as his side fell just short of their first ever victory in a Rugby World Cup match, losing 16–17, in the process also becoming Namibia's all-time top points scorer and their top points scorer in a Rugby World Cup tournament.

2016–present : Boland Cavaliers / Kings

After the 2015 Rugby World Cup, it was announced that Kotzé would return to South Africa to join the  prior to the 2016 Currie Cup season. Shortly after being officially announced as a Boland Cavaliers player, he was also given a contract by Port Elizabeth-based side the Southern Kings to play for them during the 2016 Super Rugby season.

Notes

References

1987 births
Living people
Namibian rugby union players
University of Johannesburg alumni
People from ǁKaras Region
Namibian expatriate rugby union players
Expatriate rugby union players in South Africa
Namibian expatriate sportspeople in South Africa
Namibia international rugby union players
Leopards (rugby union) players
SWD Eagles players
White Namibian people
Namibian Afrikaner people